Bow Valley High School is a public secondary school located in the township of Cochrane, Alberta, Canada.  The school falls under the jurisdiction of the Rocky View Schools.   The school's enrollment is approximately 800 to 900 students, in grades 9 through 12. 
Its mascot is the Bobcat.

Athletics
The Bow Valley Bobcats have membership in the Rocky View Sports Association, and compete and participate in the South Central Zone of the Alberta Schools Athletic Association.

References

External links
 Bow Valley High School
Rocky View Schools

High schools in Alberta
Educational institutions established in 2001
2001 establishments in Alberta